Summer Nights was a concert residency by Australian recording artist, Olivia Newton-John. The residency took place in the Donny & Marie Showroom at the Flamingo Las Vegas. It began April 2014 and ended December 2016. Her three-year run even prompted a live album entitled Summer Nights: Live in Las Vegas (2015).

Background and development 
Rumors of a Vegas residency were first reported in June 2012. Initially, Newton-John was to perform in the middle of 2013. However, her sister's brain cancer and death postponed the residency indefinitely. On 4 February 2014, the residency was officially announced/resumed for 45 shows beginning April 2014. Entitled, "Summer Nights", the shows were intended to be intimate, not the usual Vegas-style spectacular. Newton-John performed with an eight-piece band and simple staging. She performed her greatest hits, including songs from hit films Grease and Xanadu. During an interview with Closer Weekly, Newton John revealed with former co-star, John Travolta was to come to a show, she would try to get him onstage for a duet. In July 2014, Newton-John confirmed the extension of Summer Nights, with twenty-four additional dates which ran until January 2015. The show was subsequently extended throughout 2015 and 2016.

When asked on her decision to perform in Vegas, Newton-John explained that her previous tours of the United States included performing in casinos in small towns, outside of the metro area. She was told many fans were not willing to travel to the towns however some would travel to Vegas for the Vegas experience. She also stated the comfort of performing at one venue for the tenure. Speaking of the concerts, Newton-John stated: "I am thrilled to be able to call Las Vegas home for a while. I have performed here many times through the years and have had nothing but wonderful memories and I look forward to even more fun at the Flamingo. I am especially thrilled that a portion of every ticket sold will benefit the Olivia Newton-John Cancer and Wellness Centre".

Critical reception 
Mike Weatherford of Las Vegas Review-Journal stated that "Newton-John said herself in an interview that she’s not a 'razzmatazz' performer. But not long into this by-the-numbers retrospective, I realized she is an entertainer" and "If you expect anything more ambitious from the forever 'nice girl' at this point, well that would just be mean". Steve Bornfeld of Vegas Seven described Summer Nights as a show which "reflects what [Newton-John] has always been: a lovely woman with a pretty voice singing sweet ballads and catchy pop tunes without an ounce of artifice or affectation". Sam Masseur of Vegas Chatter wrote: "For anyone who’s ever enjoyed an Olivia Newton-John song, Summer Nights will be a perfect evening of entertainment".

Set list 
This set list is representative of the show on 8 April 2014. It does not represent all concerts for the duration of the residency.

 "Pearls on a Chain"
 "Have You Never Been Mellow"
 "Xanadu"
 "Magic"
 "Suddenly"
 "A Little More Love"
 "Sam"
 "If Not for You"
 "Let Me Be There"
 "Please Mr. Please"
 "Take Me Home, Country Roads"
 "If You Love Me (Let Me Know)"
 "Physical"
 "Cry Me a River"
 "Send in the Clowns"
 "Not Gonna Give Into It"
 "Look at Me, I'm Sandra Dee (Reprise)"
 "You're the One That I Want"
 "Hopelessly Devoted to You"
 "Summer Nights"
 "We Go Together"
 "I Honestly Love You"
 "Over the Rainbow"

Shows

References

External links 
The Official Olivia Newton-John Website
Olivia Newton-John: Summer Nights

Concert residencies in the Las Vegas Valley
Olivia Newton-John concert tours
2014 concert residencies
2015 concert residencies
2016 concert residencies